A sub-dean is a person who acts as an assistant to a dean either in church circuit as a priest or minister or an academic institution. They are, however, not a vice-dean. A vice-dean is a person who can deputize a dean whereas a sub-dean can only assist or carry out assignments as may be delegated to them by a dean. A vice-dean can exercise the powers of a dean in their absence but a sub-dean only report to a dean and does not have the power of a dean.

See also 
 Cardinal Vice-Dean

Anglican ecclesiastical offices
Ecclesiastical titles
Church of England deans
Christian religious occupations
Catholic ecclesiastical titles